Banco Popular Español, S.A. was the sixth largest banking group in Spain before it was bought by Banco Santander as part of a rescue package in June 2017.

Components
The group consisted of the following companies: national bank Banco Popular Español, regional bank Banco Pastor, mortgage bank Banco Popular Hipotecario, private bank Popular Banca Privada, French subsidiary Banco Popular France (sold to Crédit Mutuel in 2008), Portugal subsidiary Banco Popular Portugal, USA subsidiary TotalBank (now part of City National Bank of Florida), Internet bank WiZink, and estate services subsidiary Aliseda. The bank had international offices in Belgium, Chile, Germany, Hong Kong, Morocco, Netherlands, Switzerland (Geneva and Zürich), London, United States], France, Italy, and Venezuela.

History

Banco Popular Español (BPE) was founded in 1926.
BPE opened a representative office in Paris in 1968 that became a subsidiary that by 1991 had a network of 14 branches in France.
In 1992 BPE converted its subsidiary in France into a joint venture with Banco Comercial Português under the name Banco Popular Comercial.
BPE established a network of branches in Portugal in 2000.

In 2002 BPE and Banco Comercial Português parted ways; Banco Popular Comercial becomes a wholly owned subsidiary of Banco Popular and changes its name to Banco Popular France. In Portugal, Banco Popular buys Banco Nacional de Crédito (BNC) and transfers its existing branches there to BNC. Later, in 2005, BNC changed its name to Banco Popular Portugal.
In 2007 BPE bought a small bank in Southern Florida (United States of America) called TotalBank for US$300 million. The bank has 20 branches in Miami Dade County and more than 400 employees.

In 2017 SRM put Banco Popular under resolution process. All existing stocks and additional Tier 1 instruments are written down. Tier 2 instruments are converted into stocks and then sold to Banco Santander S.A. for €1. On August 8, 2017, it was announced that Banco Santander would sell its portion of Banco Popular's real estate business to the New York City-based private equity corporation Blackstone Group.

References

External links

Investor relations 
Banco Popular France
Grupo Banco Popular 

Defunct banks of Spain
Companies based in the Community of Madrid
Banks established in 1926
banks based in Madrid
Companies listed on the Madrid Stock Exchange
Spanish companies established in 1926